Al-Hanashat is a sub-district located in Nihm District, Sana'a Governorate, Yemen. Al-Hanashat had a population of 8718 according to the 2004 census.

References 

Sub-districts in Nihm District